The Guianan woodcreeper (Lepidocolaptes albolineatus) is a species of bird in the subfamily Dendrocolaptinae.

It is found in northern Brazil, French Guiana, Suriname, Guyana, and eastern Venezuela. Its natural habitat is subtropical or tropical moist lowland forests.

References

Guianan woodcreeper
Birds of the Guianas
Guianan woodcreeper
Birds of the Amazon Basin
Birds of Brazil
Taxonomy articles created by Polbot